Winchester is a historic city in southern England.

Winchester may also refer to:

In Winchester, England
Winchester (UK Parliament constituency)
Winchester Cathedral
Diocese of Winchester
Bishop of Winchester
Winchester College
City of Winchester, the local government district containing Winchester
University of Winchester

People with the surname
Henry of Winchester (1207–1271), who would become King Henry III of England
Henry of Winchester (1101–1171), also known as Henry of Blois, the Bishop of Winchester
Benjamin Winchester (1817–1901), early leader in the Latter Day Saint movement
Boyd Winchester (1836–1923), United States Representative from Kentucky
Brad Winchester (born 1981) American professional ice hockey player
Caleb Thomas Winchester (1847–1920), professor for English literature at Wesleyan University, Middletown, Connecticut
Charles Alexander Winchester (?-1883) consul of the United Kingdom in Shanghai
Colin Winchester (1933–1989), highest-ranking officer to be murdered in Australian policing history
Elhanan Winchester (1751–1797), preacher
Ernie Winchester (1944–2013), Scottish footballer
Ian Winchester (born 1973), discus thrower from New Zealand
Jack Winchester (disambiguation)
Jesse Winchester (1944–2014), stage name of musician James Ridout Winchester
Jesse Winchester (ice hockey) (born 1983), Canadian professional ice hockey player
John de Winchester (d. 1460), bishop of Moray
Jude Winchester, Northern Irish footballer
Mary Winchester (Zoluti) (1865–1955), English girl kidnapped by Mizos
Olive Winchester (1879–1947), pioneer biblical scholar and theologian in the Church of the Nazarene
Oliver Winchester (1810–1880), largest stockholder of the Winchester Repeating Arms Company
Sarah Winchester (1837–1922), wife of William Winchester and builder of the Winchester Mystery House
Scott Winchester (born 1973), American former Major League Baseball player
Shurwayne Winchester (born 1974), soca artist from Trinidad and Tobago
Simon Winchester (born 1944), author and journalist
William Wirt Winchester (1838–1881), son of Oliver Winchester

Fictional characters
Major Charles Emerson Winchester III, a character in the television series M*A*S*H
Dean Winchester, a character in the television series Supernatural
John Winchester (Supernatural), a character in the television series Supernatural
Mary Winchester (Supernatural), a character in the television series Supernatural
Sam Winchester, a character in the television series Supernatural

Places

United States
Winchester, Arkansas
Winchester, California
Winchester (San Jose), a neighborhood of San Jose, California
Winchester Transit Center, a light rail station in Campbell, California
Winchester, Connecticut
Winchester, Georgia
Winchester, Idaho
Winchester, Illinois
Winchester, Indiana
Winchester, Iowa
Winchester, Kansas
Winchester, Kentucky
Winchester-on-the-Severn, Maryland
Winchester, Massachusetts
Winchester, Michigan
Winchester, Mississippi
Winchester, Missouri
Winchester, Clark County, Missouri
Winchester, Nevada
Winchester, New Hampshire, a New England town
Winchester (CDP), New Hampshire, the main village in the town
Winchester, Adams County, Ohio
Winchester, Jackson County, Ohio
Winchester, Richland County, Ohio
Winchester, Oklahoma
Winchester, Woods County, Oklahoma
Winchester, Oregon
Winchester, Tennessee
Winchester, Texas
Winchester, Virginia
Winchester, Grant County, Washington, an unincorporated community
Winchester, Vilas County, Wisconsin, a town
Winchester (community), Vilas County, Wisconsin, unincorporated community within the town
Winchester, Winnebago County, Wisconsin, a town
Winchester, Wyoming

Elsewhere
747 Winchester, an asteroid
Winchester, Ontario, Canada
Winchester, New Zealand

Computers and software
Winchester, code name for an Athlon 64 processor model
Winchester disk, a once-common generic name for hard disks, from the code name for the early IBM 3340 storage system
Winchester connector, a connector for wideband modems located on layer 1 on the OSI model, specified in the ITU-T Recommendation V.35 standard and later in Rec. V.11

Entertainment
 The Winchesters, a U.S. fantasy television series, spin-off of the WB/CW show Supernatural
The Winchester, a fictional English pub in the movie Shaun of The Dead
Winchester '73, an American Western movie released in 1950 starring James Stewart, remade as a made-for-TV film in 1967
Winchester (film), a 2018 American horror film

Firearms
Winchester Repeating Arms Company, manufacturer of Winchester firearms
Winchester rifle, a lever-action rifle popular in the US since the mid-19th century
9×23mm Winchester, a centerfire pistol cartridge (introduced c. 1996)

Vessels
HMS Winchester, a name used seven times for Royal Navy warships from 1693–1946
USS Winchester (SP-156), a United States Navy patrol vessel in commission from 1917–1919
 Winchester, the class name for the military BHC SR.N6

Weights and measures
Winchester measure, an archaic set of weights and measures
Winchester quart, an archaic measure of volume

Other uses
Book of Winchester (also known as the Domesday Book), the record of the great survey of England completed in 1086 for William I
Winchester (bottle), used in laboratories for the storage of corrosive chemicals
Winchester Mystery House, a well-known mansion in San Jose, California, United States
The Winchester, Highgate, a London pub, England, United Kingdom

See also